Blanchard is an unincorporated community and coal town in West Deer Township, Allegheny County, Pennsylvania, United States. It lies at an elevation of 1129 feet (344 m).

References

Unincorporated communities in Allegheny County, Pennsylvania
Unincorporated communities in Pennsylvania